Motola is a 45-year-old female Asian elephant in Thailand who stepped on a landmine in 1999, while working at a logging camp near the Burmese border. The mine mangled her left front foot and leg, and her foot was amputated shortly after. The accident highlighted the dangers of mines that remain from various insurgencies.

Motola walked on three legs for a number of years until she was fitted with a prosthetic foot. She received medical care at the Friends of the Asian Elephant Foundation hospital.

See also
 List of individual elephants

References

External links
Motola's story in photos

Individual elephants
Landmine victims